Chile competed at the 2012 Summer Olympics in London, from 27 July to 12 August 2012. This nation has competed at every Olympic games, except the 1932 Summer Olympics in Los Angeles, and the 1980 Summer Olympics in Moscow because of the United States boycott.

The Chile Olympic Committee (COCH) sent a total of 35 athletes to the Games, 21 men and 14 women, to compete in 17 sports. There was only a single competitor in track cycling, judo, modern pentathlon, rowing, shooting, swimming and taekwondo. Among the sports played by the athletes, Chile made its Olympics debut in artistic gymnastics and Greco-Roman wrestling. The Chilean team featured six athletes who competed at their fourth Olympics: archer Denisse van Lamoen, épée fencer Paris Inostroza, table tennis player Berta Rodríguez and three of its oldest members from the equestrian jumping team. Van Lamoen was also appointed by the committee to carry the nation's flag at the opening ceremony.

With poor athletic performance and the absence of tennis players in the team, Chile failed to win a single medal for the first time in Olympic history since 1996. Gymnast Tomás González missed out on an Olympic medal in London, after finishing fourth in men's floor and vault exercises.

Archery

Chile has qualified one archer for the women's individual event.

Athletics

Chilean athletes have so far achieved qualifying standards in the following athletics events (up to a maximum of 3 athletes in each event at the 'A' Standard, and 1 at the 'B' Standard):

Key
 Note – Ranks given for track events are within the athlete's heat only
 Q = Qualified for the next round
 q = Qualified for the next round as a fastest loser or, in field events, by position without achieving the qualifying target
 NR = National record
 N/A = Round not applicable for the event
 Bye = Athlete not required to compete in round

Men
Track & road events

Combined events – Decathlon

Women
Track & road events

Field events

Cycling

Chile had qualified a quota place in the men's road race after Gonzalo Garrido finished second at the 2011 American Championships, and in the men's omnium.

Road

Track
Omnium

Equestrian

Chile has qualified 4 riders.

Jumping

Fencing

Chile has qualified 2 fencers.
Men

Women

Gymnastics

Artistic
Men

Women

Judo

Modern pentathlon

Esteban Bustos has qualified for the Olympics, after winning the bronze medal at the 2011 Pan American Games in  Guadalajara, Mexico.

Rowing

Chile has qualified the following boat.
Men

Qualification Legend: FA=Final A (medal); FB=Final B (non-medal); FC=Final C (non-medal); FD=Final D (non-medal); FE=Final E (non-medal); FF=Final F (non-medal); SA/B=Semifinals A/B; SC/D=Semifinals C/D; SE/F=Semifinals E/F; QF=Quarterfinals; R=Repechage

Sailing

Chile has so far qualified 2 boat for each of the following events
Men

M = Medal race; EL = Eliminated  – did not advance into the medal race

Shooting 

Francisca Crovetto has ensured a berth in the women's skeet event.
Women

Swimming

Swimmers have so far achieved qualifying standards in the following events (up to a maximum of 2 swimmers in each event at the Olympic Qualifying Time (OQT), and potentially 1 at the Olympic Selection Time (OST)):

Women

Table tennis 

Chile has qualified 1 athlete.

Taekwondo

Chile has qualified one woman.

Triathlon

Chile has qualified two athletes.

Weightlifting

Chile has qualified 1 woman and 1 man.

Wrestling

Chile has qualified in the following events.

Key
  - Victory by Fall.
  - Decision by Points - the loser with technical points.
  - Decision by Points - the loser without technical points.

Men's Greco-Roman

See also
 Chile at the 2011 Pan American Games

References

2012 in Chilean sport
Nations at the 2012 Summer Olympics
2012